A Flock of Bleeps is the debut studio album by the music group Younger Brother. It is a collaborative psybient/psychill project between English psytrance producers Simon Posford (Hallucinogen, Shpongle) and Benji Vaughan (Prometheus).

Track listing
Source: Psyshop.com

References

2003 debut albums
Younger Brother albums
Albums produced by Benji Vaughan